Murray Kangaroos Football Club, officially nicknamed The Kangaroos, was an Australian rules football club which competed in the Victorian Football League between 2000 and 2002. The football club was a joint venture between the North Melbourne Football Club and the Ovens and Murray Football League and served as North Melbourne's reserve side.

The Ovens and Murray region was formerly zoned towards North Melbourne, and the club enjoys good support in the area.

History

Following season 1999, the AFL Reserves Grade was terminated leaving AFL clubs without a place to field their reserves players. The Kangaroos, together with the Ovens and Murray Football League launched their own stand-alone VFL club in the Victorian Football League called the Murray Kangaroos. The club's home games were split between Coburg City Oval in Melbourne, and Lavington Oval in Albury-Wodonga.

The side was made up with players from the Kangaroos, and topped up with players from the Ovens and Murray League offering a second chance to footballers who had missed out on the draft.

At the end of 2002, The Kangaroos disbanded the club citing pressure from the AFL, and cost-cutting measures (the club cost around $100,000 a year to field). North Melbourne instead decided to align with the Port Melbourne Football Club in a short-term deal.

Honour roll

Coach

2000 – Ross Smith
2001 – Paul Hamilton
2002 – Paul Hamilton

Best and Fairest
 2000 – Stuart Cochrane
 2001 – Mark Hilton
 2002 – Adam Lange

Leading Goalkicker
2000 – Kent Kingsley 34 goals
2001 – Leigh Harding 53 goals
2002 – Rodney Tregenza 54 goals

VFL Club Records
Highest score:  26.18 (174) v Essendon, Round 9, 2002, Windy Hill
Lowest score:  5.9 (39) v Sandringham, Round 16, 2000, Lavington Sports Ground, & 5.9 (39) v Coburg, Round 18, 2000, Lavington Sports Ground
Greatest winning margin: 96 points v Essendon, Round 9, 2002, Windy Hill
Greatest losing margin: 93 points v Coburg, Round 20, 2001, Coburg City Oval
Lowest Winning Score: 13.10 (88) v Preston 9.12 (66), Round 16, 2001, Lavington Sports Ground
Highest Losing Score: 17.14 (116) v Box Hill 22.13 (145), Round 5, 2002, Box Hill City Oval, & 17.14 (116) v Preston 18.14 (122), Round 11, 2002, Coburg City Oval

References

Australian rules football clubs established in 2000
North Melbourne Football Club
Former Victorian Football League clubs
Australian rules football clubs in Melbourne
Australian rules football clubs disestablished in 2002
2000 establishments in Australia
2002 disestablishments in Australia